Hundley is a surname. Notable people with the surname include:

Amelia Hundley (born 1998), American gymnast
Brett Hundley (born 1993), American football quarterback
Elliott Hundley (born 1975), sculptor 
H. R. Hundley (1867–1934), American college football coach
Hot Rod Hundley (1934–2015), American basketball player and sportscaster 
John Hundley (1899 - 1990), musical comedy singer, actor and television executive
John Walker Hundley (1841-1914),  Baptist minister 
Nick Hundley (born 1983), baseball catcher 
Randy Hundley (born 1942), American baseball catcher
Oscar Richard Hundley (1855 – 1921), American judge
Sterling Hundley (born 1976), illustrator and painter
Todd Hundley (born 1969), American baseball catcher; son of Randy
William G. Hundley (1925-2006), American criminal defense attorney

See also
Hunley
Huntley (surname)